Krstec is a village in Municipality of Prilep, North Macedonia. Krstec is the highest settlement of the municipality.

Demographics
According to the 2002 census, the village had a total of 1 inhabitants. Ethnic groups in the village include:

Macedonians 1

References

Villages in Prilep Municipality